Neostege is a genus of moths of the family Crambidae described by George Hampson in 1910. It contains only one species, Neostege holoxutha, described in the same article, which is found in Zambia and Zimbabwe.

References

Spilomelinae
Taxa named by George Hampson
Crambidae genera
Monotypic moth genera